Dulah is a former station (siding) along the Union Pacific Railroad tracks on the north coast of Ventura County, California. Solimar Beach Colony, a gated community of 70 homes, has been built here and is the first beach community north of the city of Ventura along the Pacific Coast Highway. This north coast portion of the county between Ventura and the Santa Barbara County line is commonly known as the Rincon, sharing the name of the community at Rincon Point, which is located at the county line. It is within the Ventura Unified School District and has a Ventura zip code.

References

Populated coastal places in California
Unincorporated communities in Ventura County, California
Unincorporated communities in California